Transcription initiation factor TFIID subunit 4B is a protein that in humans is encoded by the TAF4B gene.

Function 

TATA-binding protein associated factors (TAFs) participate, with TATA binding protein (TBP; MIM 600075), in the formation of the TFIID protein complex (see MIM 313650), which is involved in the initiation of gene transcription by RNA polymerase II (see MIM 180660).[supplied by OMIM]

Interactions 

TAF4B has been shown to interact with RELA.

References

Further reading